The Bengal and North Western Railway was owned and worked by the Bengal and North Western Railway Company (registered 23 October 1882, dissolved October 1946). The Bengal and North Western Railway was merged into the Oudh and Tirhut Railway on 1 January 1943.

Bengal & North Western main line
Bengal & North Western main line was a  metre gauge line consisting of the following sections:
 Sonepur to Mankapur opened 15 January 1885
 Mankapur to Gonda opened 2 April 1884
 Gonda to Colonelganj opened (29 October 1891) 1 February 1892
 Colonelganj to Jarwal Road opened 1 February 1892
 Jarwal Road to Bahramghat (including Elgin Bridge) opened 18 December 1896
 Bahramghat to Burhwal opened 24 November 1896
 Burwhal to Barabanki opened 1 April 1872
 Burhwal to Barabanki (broad to mixed gauge) converted 24 November 1896
 Burhwal to Barabanki (mixed to metre gauge) converted around 1943
 Dighwara-Goldingganj diversion opened around 1960
 Barabanki to Chhapra (metre to broad gauge) converted 1981
 Chhapra Kacheri to Dighwara (metre to broad gauge) converted autumn 2006

Bengal & North Western Railway Loop line
Chapra-Allahabad line (metre gauge: 200 miles) 
Chapra (Chhapra) to Revelganj (7 miles)
Revelganj to west of Revelganj (1 mile) opened (15 April) 15 May 1891 opened (15 Mar) 1 April 1899 
West of Revelganj to Bakulaha (5 miles) (Inchcape Bridge) opened 7 February 1912
Bakulaha to Phephna (33 miles) 
Phephna to Ghazipur (31 miles) 
Ghazipur ghat to Aunrihar (26 miles) 
Aunrihar to Benares (Varanasi) City (EI) (20 miles) Benares Cant. (BNW) to Benares City (BNW) (2 miles)
Benares Cant (Junction) (EI) to Madhosingh (29 miles) 
Madhosingh to Jhusi (41 miles) 
Jhusi to Izat Bridge (3 miles) 
Izat Bridge to Allahabad City (1 mile) ~ old Manjhi branch (metre gauge: 3 miles) Revelganj to Manjhi (3 miles) ~ old Chandiara ghat branch (metre gauge: 2 miles) 
Bakulaha to Chandiaraghat (2 miles)
Phephna to Indara (32 miles) 
Mirzapur branch (metre gauge: 7 miles) Madhosingh to Mirzapurghat (6 miles) Mirzapurghat to Chilh (½ mile) 
Maharajganj branch (metre gauge: 4 miles) 
Duraundha (Daronda) to Maharajganj (broad gauge: 4 miles) 
Siwan-Captainganj line (metre gauge: 79 miles) 
Siwan (Sawan) to Thawe (metre to broad gauge: 18 miles) 
Thawe to Turkauha (Tamkuki Road) (23 miles)
Turkauha to Captainganj (Kaptanganj) (38 miles) 
Bhatni-Benares Chord (metre gauge: 79 miles) 
Bhatni to Tartipur (17 miles) 
Tartipur to Mau (26 miles) 
Mau to Aunrihar (36 miles) 
Bhatni to Aunrihar (metre to broad gauge) 
Barhaj branch (metre gauge: 13 miles) Salimpur to Barhaj Bazar (13 miles)
Dohrighat branch (metre gauge: 54 miles) 
Indara to Dohrighat (22 miles)
Shahganj branch (metre gauge: 62 miles) 
Mau to Azamgarh (27 miles) 
Azamgarh to Shahganj (35 miles)
Jaunpur branch (metre gauge: 36 miles)
Aunrihar-Jaunpur via Kerakat (opened 21 March 1904)

Rolling stock

In 1936 the company owned 386 locomotives, 1293 coaches and 12.191 goods wagons.

Classification
It was labeled as a Class I railway according to Indian Railway Classification System of 1926.

Bengal and North Western Railway Battalion, Bengal Army
The Bengal and North Western Railway Battalion was an infantry regiment under the Volunteer Corps of the British Indian Army. The auxiliary regiment was formed on 14 June 1879 as the Bengal and North Western Railway Volunteer Rifles by the British East India Company. The headquarters of the regiment was established in Gorakhpur in the state of Uttar Pradesh. The uniform of Bengal and North Western Railway Battalion was khaki drill with white facings and the military badge included St. Andrew's cross in a thistle wreath. The battalion included staff from the Bengal and North Western Railway which was a metre gauge railway company. On 17 June 1892, the Bengal and North Western Railway Battalion was merged with the Tirhut State Railway Volunteer Rifle Corps. Later in 1917 it was designated as the 22nd Bengal and North Western Railway Battalion. Eventually the regiment was renamed as the Bengal and North Western Railway Battalion on 1 October 1920.

See also
 Rail transport in India#History

Notes
 Rao, M.A. (1988). Indian Railways, New Delhi: National Book Trust
 Chapter 1 - Evolution of Indian Railways-Historical Background

References

External links
 

Defunct railway companies of India
Railway companies established in 1882
Railway companies disestablished in 1943
History of rail transport in Uttar Pradesh